Beech Mountain is a mountain in Sullivan County, New York. It is located north-northeast of Debruce. Rattle Hill is located west-southwest and Bald Mountain is located south-southwest of Beech Mountain. Beech Mountain is the highest point in Sullivan County and it is ranked 10 of 62 on the list of New York County High Points.

References

Mountains of Sullivan County, New York
Mountains of New York (state)